Elfonía was an experimental rock band with elements of progressive and ambient music. It was founded by Alejandro Millán and Marcela Bovio in 2001 following the leaving of their previous band, Hydra.

The band's line-up was extended in 2003 for purposes of a major music festival held in Monterrey, Mexico with Roberto Quintanilla on lead guitar, Pablo González on bass guitar and Javier Garagarza on drums. By the end of the year, Elfonía independently produced their self-titled first studio album which marked their breakthrough into mainstream music. In November 2003, Marcela was invited by Arjen Anthony Lucassen to perform vocals on Ayreon's album The Human Equation.

Two years later the band released their second studio album, This Sonic Landscape, a fusion of many music genres, including progressive rock, jazz, ambient music and goth rock. Shortly afterwards, Elfonía went on a successful tour around Mexico in order to promote their newest effort.

The band split up in December 2006. Bovio and Millán continued in Stream of Passion with Lucassen.

Personnel
 Alejandro Millán - keyboards, rhythm guitar
 Marcela Bovio - vocals, violin
 Roberto Quintanilla - lead guitar
 Pablo González - bass guitar
 Javier Garagarza - drums

Discography

Studio albums

Elfonía (2003)
The band's debut album was released on January 14, 2003. It was recorded at Caura Studio in Monterrey, Mexico and released independently by Marcela Bovio and Alejandro Millán.

Track listing

Personnel

 Alejandro Millán - keyboards
 Marcela Bovio - vocals, violin
 Roberto Quintanilla - lead guitar
 Pablo González - bass guitar
 Javier Garagarza - drums

This Sonic Landscape

References

Mexican rock music groups
Progressive metal musical groups
Musical groups established in 2001
Musical groups disestablished in 2006